Bauple Forest is a locality in the Fraser Coast Region, Queensland, Australia.

Geography
Most of the locality is within the Bauple State Forest except for a small area in the west of the locality.

History 
The locality was named and bounded on 13 March 1998. The origin of the name is not reported but presumably refers to the Bauple State Forest.

References 

Fraser Coast Region
Localities in Queensland